Karen Kavaleryan (born June 5, 1961 in Moscow, Russian SFSR, Soviet Union) is a Russian-Armenian lyricist. He currently holds the record (with Sharon Vaughn and Ralph Siegel) for representing the most countries in the Eurovision Song Contest with five. The countries are Russia in 2002 and 2006, Belarus in 2007, Armenia in 2007 and 2010, Ukraine in 2008 and 2013 and Georgia in 2008. 

Karen Kavaleryan is widely considered as the most successful Russian lyricist, he is 27 times finalist of "Song of the Year" gala, author of anthem of 2014 Winter Olympics and the final song 2014 Winter Paralympics, performed by José Carreras and Diana Gurtskaya, during his career has published more than 700 songs performed by Gorky Park, Bravo, Prime-Minister, Alla Pugacheva, Philip Kirkorov, Nikolay Baskov, Valeriya, Dima Bilan and many others. 

Artyom Kavaleryan, son of Karen Kavaleryan, is the lyricist of the Russian entry in the Junior Eurovision Song Contest 2005 "Doroga k solntsu" performed by Vlad Krutskikh.

Eurovision Song Contest entries

†1 Lyrics co-written with Evgene Fridlyand & Irina Antonyan
†2 Lyrics co-written with Irina Antonyan
†3 Lyrics co-written with Hayko (Armenian part)

National Finals entries
2005 Russia Alexandr Panaiotov & Alexey Chumakov, Balalayka and Russian version Balalayka
2005 Russia A-Sortie, Keep On Shinin' and Russian version Sharik
2006 Russia Dima Bilan, Lady Flame
2006 Russia Jasmin, Foreigner
2007 Belarus Diana Gurtskaya, How Long
2008 Russia Alexandr Panaiotov, Crescent & Cross
2008 Russia Anatoliy Alyoshin, One More Try
2012 Russia Mark Tishman, Money vs Love

External links
http://www.karen-kavaleryan.ru/

1961 births
Living people
Musicians from Moscow
Russian lyricists
Russian people of Armenian descent
Ethnic Armenian musicians